Künneth is a surname. Notable people with the surname include:

 Hermann Künneth (1892–1975), German mathematician
 Walter Künneth (1901–1997), German Protestant theologian

German-language surnames